In real analysis, a branch of mathematics, Gautschi's inequality is an inequality for ratios of gamma functions.  It is named after Walter Gautschi.

Statement
Let  be a positive real number, and let .  Then

History
In 1948, Wendel proved the inequalities

He used this to determine the asymptotic behavior of a ratio of gamma functions. The upper bound in this inequality is stronger than the one given above.

In 1959, Gautschi independently proved two inequalities for ratios of gamma functions.  His lower bounds were identical to Wendel's.  One of his upper bounds was the one given in the statement above, while the other one was sometimes stronger and sometimes weaker than Wendel's.

Consequences
An immediate consequence is the following description of the asymptotic behavior of ratios of gamma functions:

Proofs
There are several known proofs of Gautschi's inequality. One simple proof is based on the strict logarithmic convexity of Euler's gamma function.

The resulting inequalities are:

Rearranging the first of these gives the lower bound, while rearranging the second and applying the trivial estimate  gives the upper bound.

Related inequalities
A survey of inequalities for ratios of gamma functions was written by Qi.

The proof by logarithmic convexity gives the stronger upper bound

Gautschi's original paper proved a different stronger upper bound,

where  is the digamma function.  Neither of these upper bounds is always stronger than the other.

Kershaw proved two tighter inequalities.

Gautschi's inequality is specific to a quotient of gamma functions evaluated at two real numbers having a small difference. However, there are extensions to other situations.

For , this leads to the estimates

A more explicit inequality valid for a wider class of arguments is due to Kečkić and Vasić, who proved that if , then:

Guo, Qi, and Srivastava proved a similar-looking inequality, valid for all :

For , this leads to:

References

 Gautschi Walter, (1959), Some Elementary Inequalities Relating to the Gamma and Incomplete Gamma Function, Journal of Mathematics and Physics, 38, doi:10.1002/sapm195938177.

Gamma and related functions